Project Syndicate is an international media organization that publishes and syndicates commentary and analysis on a variety of global topics. All opinion pieces are published on the Project Syndicate website, but are also distributed to a wide network of partner publications for print. As of 2019, it has a network of 506 media outlets in 156 countries.

Project Syndicate, which Ezra Klein described as "the world's smartest op-ed page," provides commentaries on a wide range of topics, from economic policy and strategies for growth worldwide to human rights, Islam, and the environment. It also offers monthly series dedicated to Africa, Europe, Asia, and Latin America, as well as to China and Russia. RealClearWorld also named Project Syndicate one of the top five world news sites for 2012.

A not-for-profit organization, Project Syndicate relies primarily on contributions from newspapers in developed countries, which make up roughly 60% of its membership base, to enable it to offer its services at reduced rates, or for free, to newspapers in countries where journalistic resources may not be readily available. Project Syndicate has also received grants from George Soros's Open Society Foundations, The Politiken Foundation in Denmark, Die Zeit, ZEIT-Stiftung, and The Bill and Melinda Gates Foundation.

Project Syndicate translates its columns from English into 13 languages, including Arabic, Chinese, Czech, Dutch, French, German, Hindi, Indonesian, Italian, Kazakh, Norwegian, Polish, Portuguese, Russian, and Spanish. More than half of Project Syndicate's partners receive their content at a discounted rate, enabling relevant and valuable content to reach readers in areas where media freedom and funding are restricted.

Contributors 
Project Syndicate has around 80 authors who submit opinion commentaries on a regular or monthly basis.

References 



Print syndication